Kukurantumi is the capital of the Abuakwa North Municipal District of the Eastern Region of Ghana.

It is noted for Adonten Senior High School, Ofori panin High School, Only Believe Senior High Technical School, Bright School High, Christian Heritage High School, Saint Paul High School. Kukurantumi is the district head of Abuakwa North Municipalities and also the St. Paul's Technical Institute.

References

Populated places in the Eastern Region (Ghana)